Pripyat is an abandoned Ukrainian city near the Chernobyl Nuclear Power Plant.

Pripyat may also refer to:

Places
 Pinsk Marshes, or Pripyat Marshes
 Pripyat (river), a river in Belarus and Ukraine notably running through the area of the Chernobyl Nuclear Power Plant and near Prypyat, Ukraine

Arts, entertainment, and media
 Pripyat (film), 1999 Czech documentary about workers in Pripyat
 S.T.A.L.K.E.R.: Call of Pripyat, a first-person shooter survival horror video game